John Augustine Dooley III (born April 10, 1944) is an American lawyer and former judge who served as a justice of the Vermont Supreme Court from 1987 to 2017.

Biography
John A. Dooley of South Burlington, Vermont was born in Nashua, New Hampshire on April 10, 1944. He attended school in Nashua, and graduated from Union College in 1965 with a Bachelor of Electrical Engineering degree. He received his J.D. degree from Boston College Law School in 1968 and became an attorney in Vermont.

Dooley's career included serving as law clerk to federal judge Bernard Joseph Leddy. He was also Deputy Director and later Director of Vermont Legal Aid, Inc. Dooley was a United States magistrate judge, and served as legal counsel to Governor Madeleine M. Kunin.

From 1985 to 1987 Dooley was Vermont's Secretary of Administration. Dooley was appointed to succeed William C. Hill as an associate justice of the Vermont Supreme Court on June 12, 1987. He retired from active service on March 31, 2017.

From 1988 to 1989 Dooley was president of the Vermont Bar Association. For many years he has been involved in the Vermont-Karelia Rule of Law Project and the Russia-United States Legal Foundation.

References

External links
 John A. Dooley biography at State of Vermont Judiciary

1944 births
Living people
Politicians from Nashua, New Hampshire
People from South Burlington, Vermont
21st-century American lawyers
20th-century American lawyers
21st-century American judges
20th-century American judges
Union College (New York) alumni
Boston College Law School alumni
Vermont lawyers
Justices of the Vermont Supreme Court